Steppe Man is a 2012 Azerbaijani drama film directed by Shamil Aliyev. The film was selected as the Azerbaijani entry for the Best Foreign Language Film at the 86th Academy Awards, but it was not nominated.

Cast
 Bahruz Vagifoglu
 Salome Demuria
 Vidadi Gasanov
 Javidan Mammadly
 Vusal Mehraliyev

See also
 List of submissions to the 86th Academy Awards for Best Foreign Language Film
 List of Azerbaijani submissions for the Academy Award for Best Foreign Language Film

References

External links
 

2012 films
2012 drama films
Azerbaijani drama films
Azerbaijani-language films
Films directed by Shamil Aliyev